Catapyrenium boccanum is a species of squamulose (scaley), rock-dwelling lichen in the family Verrucariaceae. It grows on mortar or on calcareous rock. Its squamules are up to 4 mm wide, pale to dark brown with black margins and a black underside. Ascospores measure 11–15 by 5–8 μm. Because of its combination of squamulose thallus, simple ascospores (without any septa), and lack of algae in the hymenium, this species is a "catapyrenioid" lichen, of which more than 80 exist in the Verrucariaceae.

The lichen was first formally described as a new species in 1955 by Czech lichenologist Miroslav Servít. Othmar Breuss transferred it to Catapyrenium in 1990 as part of a revision of that genus. In Europe, the lichen has a largely Mediterranean distribution, although scattered records are known from western and southern Europe. It is also found in Turkey.

References

Verrucariales
Lichens described in 1955
Lichens of Europe
Lichens of Western Asia
Lichen species